Ecitoptera is a genus of flies in the family Phoridae.

Species
E. centralis Borgmeier, 1960
E. ciliata Borgmeier, 1923
E. concomitans Borgmeier & Schmitz, 1923
E. cordobensis Borgmeier, 1925
E. humeralis Borgmeier, 1960
E. maculifrons Borgmeier, 1924
E. maior Schmitz, 1924
E. microps Borgmeier, 1960
E. parallela Borgmeier, 1960
E. proboscidalis Borgmeier, 1924
E. schmitzi Borgmeier, 1923
E. subciliata Borgmeier, 1960
E. truncatipennis Borgmeier, 1960
E. watkinsi Disney, 1998

References

Phoridae
Platypezoidea genera
Taxa named by Hermann Schmitz
Taxa named by Thomas Borgmeier